The first season of the American sitcom Everybody Loves Raymond originally aired on CBS from September 13, 1996, until April 7, 1997, and consists of 22 episodes. Created and ran by Philip Rosenthal, the series revolves around the squabbles of the suburban Long Island Barone family, consisting of titular Newsday sportswriter Ray Romano, wife Debra (Patricia Heaton), parents Marie (Doris Roberts) and Frank (Peter Boyle), and brother Robert (Brad Garrett). Madylin Sweeten and her two brothers, Sullivan and Sawyer Sweeten, also star as the children of Ray and Debra. 

Produced by HBO Independent Productions, Where's Lunch, and Worldwide Pants, the season features episodes written by Romano, Rosenthal, Jeremy Stevens, Tucker Cawley, Kathy Ann Stumpe, Lew Schneider, Tom Paris, Bruce Kirschbaum, Steve Skrovan, Carol Gary, and Stephen Nathan; and directed by Jeff Meyer, Rod Daniel, Michael Lembeck, Alan Kirschenbaum, Howard Storm, and Paul Lazarus. The season, despite having strong critical support, had incredibly low ratings due to its place in the Friday night death slot, although the show did significantly better once moved to Monday in March 1997. It and the following season were also the only two of the entire series to not receive Primetime Emmy Award nominations, although the first season received four Viewers for Quality Television nominations.

Production 

The first season of Everybody Loves Raymonds was produced by HBO Independent Productions, creator Philip Rosenthal's company Where's Lunch, and Worldwide Pants, a company owned by David Letterman. Television executives offered Ray Romano several development deals for a sitcom immediately after he performed on Letterman's late-night talk show in the middle of 1995, which led to the creation of Everybody Loves Raymond. With the exception of the pilot shot at Universal City Studios, the season was filmed at Hollywood Center Studios; it was also the only season of the show to be shot there, as all of the later seasons were shot at Warner Bros. Studios.

Rosenthal's first concept for Everybody Loves Raymond's pilot focused on the titular protagonist paying too much attention to his career as a sportswriter over spending time with his family; the second act of the episode depicted him being stuck at home dealing with not only his wife and kids, but also his parents. CBS disliked this premise for being more exposition-based than a "typical episode." It took Rosenthal four more attempts at coming up with the pilot for CBS to give him the go-ahead to write the screenplay.

Two opening sequences are used in for the season: one depicting Ray Barone describing the premise of the show while getting stuck in a playhouse set, and another one of him talking while his family members move behind him on a conveyor belt.

Cast

Main 
Ray Romano as Raymond "Ray" Barone
Patricia Heaton as Debra (née Whelan) Barone
Brad Garrett as Robert Barone
Doris Roberts as Marie Barone
Peter Boyle as Francis "Frank" Barone
 Madylin Sweeten as Alexandra "Ally" Barone
 Sawyer Sweeten as Geoffrey Barone 
 Sullivan Sweeten as Michael Barone

Supporting 
 Monica Horan as Amy McDougall
 Andy Kindler as Andy
 Kevin James as Kevin Daniels
 Tom McGowan as Bernie Gruenfelder
 Maggie Wheeler as Linda Gruenfelder 
 Shamsky II
 Katherine Helmond as Lois Whelan 

 Robert Culp as Warren Whelan
 Victor Raider-Wexler as Stan
 Len Lesser as Garvin
 Joseph V. Perry as Nemo
 Tina Arning as Angelina
 Dave Attell as Dave
 Phil Leeds as Uncle Mel
 Jean Stapleton as Alda

Reception

Reviews 
John P. McCarthy of Variety gave the pilot a mixed review, criticizing the lack of "major neuroses, "stellar wit or unique personality" in the lead protagonist; bland direction; "washed-out look;" and the writing not going beyond "domestic pandemonium and squabbles." However, he also praised the performances of the parents, particularly Boyle's "diabolical air." Very early in the season, Ken Tucker wrote that while writing wasn't "top-notch," it had a very unique protagonist, "a beleaguered family man, but one who’s happy about it" and "accepting his responsibilities." The Los Angeles Times, reviewing the pilot, claimed the performances indicated a "promising" series, "even though its premise and characters may not wear well with time."

The New York Times reported Everybody Loves Raymond to be CBS's "most critically praised new show of the [1996–97] season." Entertainment Weekly critic Bruce Fretts opined that while it started as a "predictable" and "witty distillation of Romano’s stand-up act," it progressed into a "fascinatingly humane portrait of suburban dysfunction," specifically "the struggle of a grown man trying to separate from his parents and establish his own family." On Rotten Tomatoes, the season holds a 67% "Fresh" rating based on six professional reviews. Jeffrey Robinson, reviewing the season in 2004, wrote, "the plotlines are a little hollow and seem like every other sitcom, but it has a wonderful cast and some hilarious dialogue that really make this series a winner."

Both contemporaneous season reviews and retrospective pieces about the entire series spotlighted the Fruit of the Month Club sequence.

Ratings 
When Everybody Loves Raymond first aired in September 1996, CBS' scheduling strategy was having series with bankable stars perform at times that usually garnered the most viewers. Shows such as the Bill Cosby-starring Cosby (1996–2000), the Ted Danson-starring Ink (1996–97), and the Rhea Perlman-starring Pearl (1996–97) aired new episodes Monday night; this resulted in Everybody Loves Raymond, which starred an unknown Romano with only a first-time show-runner and a production company only associated with Letterman, being put in the Friday night death slot. 

During the fall 1996 season, Everybody Loves Raymond ached both in ratings and focus group test scores of episodes rated by 25 members at ASI Research in North Hollywood. With scores often being "average" or "below average," focus group members disliked the unlikeable characters, "thin" stories, lack of a contemporary tinge, and unclear categorization (A December CBS report stated, "If it is to be a family show, people often question 'where are the kids?' and 'why aren't the kids shown more?'"). Recalled test session conductor Lynne Gross, "The comment I remember occurring most often was that it was a one-joke show—nothing but a bunch of mother-in-law jokes."
The network tried to persuade Rosenthal to make the show more "hip" and "edgy," but Rosenthal refused. 

According to CBS president Les Moonves, the low ratings concerned network executives: "If the show is as good as we think it is, why isn't it improving like a tenth of a rating point every week? Just show me a little tick--that it's heading in the right direction." Nonetheless, CBS had faith the show would be successful in the future; one episode that aired on November 29 gained 24% in ratings, and another special that aired on a Monday did far better than the other episodes." CBS vice president Kelly Kahl stated in a December 1996 interview, "it is outperforming what we had last year in that time period. This is a baby step forward, which is what CBS is aiming for." The New York Times suggested CBS didn't want to cancel to series because doing so would "offend" Letterman, who owned Worldwide Pants, one of the show's production companies; and Heaton explained the series' low budget motivated the network to keep at it.

Following the poor performances of what were supposed to be a popular Monday night series, Everybody Loves Raymond was moved into in the Monday slot in March 1997, playing alongside Cosby. As a result, the series went up to a 12 ranking and doubled its average rating to 12.1, higher than Ink.

Awards 
The first season of Everybody Loves Raymond received four Q award nominations from Viewers for Quality Television: Best Quality Comedy Series, Best Actor in a Quality Comedy Series for Romano, Best Actress in a Quality Comedy Series for Heaton, and Best Supporting Actor in a Quality Comedy Series for Garrett. The show's casting director, Lisa Miller, also received an Artios Award for Outstanding Achievement in Comedy Pilot Casting.

Episodes

References

Citations

Works cited 

1996 American television seasons
1997 American television seasons
Everybody Loves Raymond seasons